APE Langadas F.C. is a Greek football club, based in Langadas, Thessaloniki.

Players

Current squad

Honors

Domestic Titles and honors
 Eps Macedonia Champions: 4
 1972–73, 1979–80, 1994–95, 2014-15
 Eps Macedonia Cup Winners: 3
 1981–82, 1991–92, 1996–97

Football clubs in Central Macedonia
Thessaloniki (regional unit)
Gamma Ethniki clubs